"Man of Steel" is a song written and recorded by American singer-songwriter and musician Hank Williams Jr.  It was released in February 1984 as the second single and title track from the album Man of Steel.  The song reached #3 on the Billboard Hot Country Singles & Tracks chart.

"Man of Steel" also appears on the compilation album Hank Williams Jr.'s Greatest Hits, Vol. 2. This however is an alternate take with the second verse removed from the original album version. The resulting track is almost one full minute shorter than the original.

Chart performance

References

1984 singles
Hank Williams Jr. songs
Songs written by Hank Williams Jr.
Song recordings produced by Jimmy Bowen
Warner Records singles
Curb Records singles
1983 songs